Movin' is the second album by Herman van Doorn.

Tracks
 I am driven
 The candle, a saint
 Black and white blues
 Listen here
 The fool on the hill
 Don't stop me now
 Shamed into love
 Movin' on
 Sounds, consider me gone
 Invitation
 Again
 Whistling away the dark
 Nature boy

References

2001 albums